Mirko Valdifiori (born 21 April 1986) is an Italian professional footballer who plays as a midfielder for  club Vis Pesaro.

A Cesena youth-product, he began his career with the senior side in 2004, but was sent on loan to Serie C sides Pavia and Legnano, before moving to Serie B side Empoli in 2008. With Empoli, he became the sixth most capped player in the team's history and helped the team achieve Serie A promotion in 2014. He made his debut in the Italian top division the following season, and his performances throughout the year earned him a transfer to Napoli in 2015. Following a successful first season in Serie A with Empoli, he also earned his first international call-up in 2015, making his Italy debut the same year.

Club career

Cesena

Born in Russi, Ravenna, Valdifiori started his professional career at Italian club Cesena. A former member of the club's youth system, his debut for the Cesena senior side came on 14 May 2005, in a 3–3 away from home draw with Genoa, during the 2004–05 Serie B season. He made one further appearance that season, in the last round. The following season, the 2005–06 season, the youngster made just one appearance, coming off the bench. In order to gain more playing time, he went out on loan to Pavia for the 2006–07 season, where he made 24 Serie C1 appearances that season. The following season he went out on loan once more, this time to Legnano, who were then in Serie C1, and made 17 appearances for the side that season. The 2007–08 Serie B season also saw the relegation of Cesena to the Lega Pro Prima Divisione (formerly the Serie C1).

Empoli

In June 2008, Cesena sold Valdifiori to Serie B team Empoli in a co-ownership deal for €520,000. The defensive midfielder immediately became an important part of the first team at Empoli, playing 32 games during the 2008–09 season, as Empoli achieved a Serie B playoff spot for promotion, but unfortunately lost out to Brescia over two legs. In June 2009 Empoli signed Valdifiori outright for another €800,000.

The 2009–10 Serie B season was similarly strong for Valdifiori, who made 36 appearances and even managed his first professional goal - the 2nd in a 2–0 win over his former side Cesena.

In the 2010–11 Serie B season, Valdifiori remained a vital part of the Empoli set up, appearing in 38 matches, including his 100th for Empoli which came against Novara on the 8 April 2011. He also scored a career high two goals that season, with both of his strikes earning draws for his side.

In the 2011–12 Serie B season, the midfield maestro sat out for a long period of time, missing rounds 21–36 of the Serie B season due to injury. Empoli finished in the relegation playoff zone this season, but fortunately managed an aggregate 3–2 win over Vicenza to remain in Serie B the following season.

Empoli had a successful 2012–13 Serie B season, surprising everyone by managing to turn around their form from the previous season, thanks to the presence of a healthy Valdifiori, whose presence throughout the season was vital to the team's performances. The holding midfielder made 42 appearances, scoring 1 goal and providing 6 assists. Empoli finished in the playoff spots and beat Novara in the first playoff round, but lost to Livorno in the following stage of the playoff, falling one step short of promotion to Serie A.

Empoli finally achieved Serie A promotion during the 2013–14 Serie B season, which saw Valdifiori play a key part in the team's success, as he managed 8 assists in 40 appearances that season.

In the 2014–15 Serie A season, Valdifiori finally made his Serie A debut in a 2–0 loss to Udinese on the first match-day of the season. In the club's fourth-Round fixture against A.C. Milan, he was sent off after receiving two consecutive yellow cards in the 85th and 86th minute. In his Round 6 return against Palermo, he assisted twice to help his side to a 3–0 win over Palermo, their first Serie A win that season. He captained Empoli for the first time in Round 19, in a 0–0 draw against Internazionale.

Napoli

After having a very successful first season in the Italian top flight with Empoli, which saw him earn his first call up for the Italy national team by manager Antonio Conte, Valdifiori officially joined Napoli on 20 June 2015 for a reported fee of €5.5 million, where he was reunited with his former Empoli coach Maurizio Sarri, also becoming the manager's very first signing at the new club. Valdifiori signed a four-year contract which will earn him €900,000 a season.

Torino

On 31 August 2016, after having played as a starter for Napoli in the first round of the season, he was purchased outright by Torino.

SPAL
On 16 August 2018, Valdifiori signed with Serie A side SPAL.

Pescara
On 8 September 2020, Valdifiori signed with Serie B club Pescara. On 14 January 2022, his contract with Pescara was terminated by mutual consent.

Vis Pesaro
On 12 November 2022, Valdifiori joined Serie C club Vis Pesaro for the 2022–23 season.

International career 
In March 2015, Valdifiori was called up by coach Antonio Conte to the Italy squad for the first time, for a Euro 2016 qualifier against Bulgaria, and a friendly against England. On 31 March 2015 he made his debut in the latter match against England, starting the 1–1 draw at the Juventus Stadium in Turin, and making way for Marco Verratti after 67 minutes.

Style of play
A creative, right-footed central midfielder with good vision, Valdifiori's preferred role is as a deep-lying playmaker in front of the defence, where he is able to utilise his passing ability to set the tempo of his team's play, and create scoring opportunities for team-mates. Although he is not known for scoring goals, he is an accurate set-piece taker, renowned for his ball delivery from free-kicks. His style of play is inspired by Andrea Pirlo.

Career statistics

Club

International

References

External links
 Football.it Profile  
 
 
 La Gazzetta dello Sport Profile  
 

1986 births
Sportspeople from the Province of Ravenna
Footballers from Emilia-Romagna
Living people
Italian footballers
Italy international footballers
Association football midfielders
Serie A players
Serie B players
Serie C players
A.C. Cesena players
F.C. Pavia players
A.C. Legnano players
Empoli F.C. players
S.S.C. Napoli players
Torino F.C. players
S.P.A.L. players
Delfino Pescara 1936 players
Vis Pesaro dal 1898 players